Mehrdad Bayrami (September 21, 1990 in Ardabil, Iran) a professional Iranian football player who plays for Padideh in the Persian Gulf Pro League.

Club career

Club career statistics

 Assist Goals

References 

 "مهرداد بایرامی" به آلومینیوم اراک پیوست Retaved in Persian www.tasnimnews.com خبرگزاری تسنیم
 مهرداد بایرامی راهی آلومینیوم اراک شد Retaved in Persian www.isna.ir خبرگزاری ایسنا 

3. مهرداد بایرامی به نساجی مازندران پیوست Retaved in Persian www.farsnews.com خبرگزاری فارس

4. بایرامی: انتظار کسب سهمیه از پدیده منطقی نبود/ کار کردن با رحمتی راحت است Retaved in Persian www.tasnimnews.com خبرگزاری تسنیم

5. بایرامی و گلزنی به تیم سابق؛ چند متر فاصله بود (عکس Retaved in Persian www.varzesh3.com ورزش 3

6. مهرداد بایرامی گربه سیاه پرسپولیس Retaved in Persian www.ilna.news خبرگزاری ایلنا

7. Biography Mehrdad Bayrami Retaved in Persian بیوگرافی مهرداد بایرامی

External links
 
 Mehrdad Bayrami at PersianLeague.com
 
 
 Mehrdad Bayrami at metafootball
 

Iranian footballers
1990 births
People from Ardabil
Living people
Machine Sazi F.C. players
Gostaresh Foulad F.C. players
Tractor S.C. players
Foolad FC players
Persian Gulf Pro League players
Azadegan League players
Association football forwards
Gol Gohar players